Aquincola amnicola is a MTBE-degrading, aerobic and motile bacterium from the genus of Aquincola.

References

Betaproteobacteria
Bacteria described in 2007